A Brass Button is a 1911 American social drama film in one reel, released on February 1, 1911. It was produced by Reliance Film Company. The actors are James Kirkwood and probably Marion Leonard.

External links

1911 films
1911 drama films
Silent American drama films
American black-and-white films
American silent short films
1910s American films